This is a list of palaces in India.

Assam
 Kareng Ghar - Former residence of Ahom royals, Sivasagar
 Talatal Ghar - Former residence of Ahom royals, Sivasagar

Bihar
Anand Bag Palace, Darbhanga
Banaili
Nagholkothi, Patna
Nargona Palace, Darbhanga
Navlakha Palace, Rajnagar

Rajasthan

 Mundota Fort and Palace - former royal residence of the Mundota Family, today a luxury hotel, Jaipur
 Umaid Bhawan Palace - Seat of the Maharaja of Jodhpur
 Amber Palace (Amber Fort) - former royal residence, Jaipur
 Jag Mandir - former residence of Shah Jahan, Udaipur
 Jag Niwas (Lake Palace) - former royal residence, Udaipur
 Jal Mahal - former royal residence, today hotel, Jaipur
 City Palace, Jaipur - Seat of the Maharaja of Jaipur
 City Palace, Udaipur - Seat of the Maharana of Udaipur
 Candra Mahal, Jaipur
 Lalgarh Palace - former royal residence, today hotel, Bikaner
 Gorbandh Palace, Jaisalmer
 Hawa Mahal (Palace of Winds) - former royal residence, Jaipur
 Narain Niwas Palace - former royal residence, today hotel, Jaipur
 Raj Mahal Palace - former royal residence, Jaipur (today hotel)
 Samode Palace - former royal residence, today hotel, Jaipur
 Rambagh Palace - former residence of the Maharaja of Jaipur (today hotel)

Madhya Pradesh

 Jai Vilas Mahal Gwalior
 Lal Bagh Palace Indore
 Rajwada Palace Indore
Raaj Mahal Palace Kathiwada
 Rajwada Palace Alirajpur 
 Rajwada Palace Jhabua 
 Jaswant Niwas Palace Sailana 
 Rang Mahal Palace Sailana 
 Ranjit Vilas Palace (Ratlam)
 Raj Mahal Palace Sitamau 
 Laduna Palace Sitamau
 City Palace Dhar 
 Jheera bagh Palace Dhar
 Datia Palace
 Orchha palace
 Jahangir Mahal, Orchha
 Govindgarh Palace Rewa
 Gohar Mahal Bhopal
 Shaukat Mahal Bhopal

Ladakh
 Stok Palace - built in 1820 by the Namgyal dynasty of Ladakh in Stok, Ladakh. Today it houses a popular museum and a boutique heritage hotel.
 Leh Palace - is a former royal palace overlooking the town of Leh, Ladakh, in the Indian Himalayas. The palace was constructed circa 1600 by Sengge Namgyal of the Namgyal dynasty of Ladakh.

Karnataka

 Amba Vilas Palace–Mysore
 Bangalore Palace - Bengaluru
 Cheluvamba Vilas Palace-Mysore
 Jayalakshmi Vilas -Mysore
 Jaganmohan Palace-Mysore
 Rajendra Vilas -Mysore
 Karanji Vilas Palace-Mysore
 Lalitha Mahal-Mysore
 Vasanth Mahal Palace-Mysore
 Lokranjan Mahal-Mysore
 Shivavilas Palace - Sandur
 Lotus Mahal - Hampi
 Shivappa Nayaka Palace - Shivamogga
 Nalknad Palace- Kodagu
 Tipu Sultan Summer Palace- Bengaluru
 Asar Mahal- Vijayapura
 Ranjin Mahal- Bidar
 Patwardhan Palace- Jamakhandi

Gujarat

 Laxmi Vilas Palace - Seat of the Maharajah of Baroda
 Aina Mahal - royal residence of ruler of Kutch.
 Vijay Vilas Palace, Mandavi - royal residence of rulers of Kutch
 Prag Mahal - royal palace of rulers of Kutch
Nilambaug Palace - Royal Palace of Rulers of Bhavnagar
Aaina Mahal - Junagadh.
Sardar Baugh Palace-Junagadh.
Rang Mahal-Junagadh.
Raj Mahal - Keshod Junagadh.
 Ranjit Vilas Palace - Palace of Thakore Sahebs of Rajkot.
  Ranjit Vilas Palace - Wankaner

Tamil Nadu 

 Padmanabhapuram Palace also known as Kalkulam Palace, located in Padmanabhapuram in the Kanyakumari district of the Indian state of Tamil Nadu.
 Tamukkam Palace is located in Madurai, Tamil Nadu.
 Fernhills Palace located in Ooty, Tamil Nadu.
 Thirumalai Nayakkar Mahal Madurai, Tamil Nadu.
 Thanjavur Maratha Palace,Tanjavur, Tamil Nadu.
 Kanadukathan Palace, Sivagangai, Tamil Nadu

Telangana

 Falaknuma Palace - royal residence, Hyderabad
 King Kothi Palace - Palace of VII Nizam, Osman Ali Khan
 Purani Haveli - Seat of the Nizam of Hyderabad
 Chowmahalla Palace
 Paigah Palace
 Kollapur Palace, Kollapur

Kerala

 Kowdiar Palace - Residence of the Travancore Royal Family, Thiruvananthapuram
 Kanakakkunnu Palace - Palace for welcoming guests of Travancore Royal Family,  Thiruvananthapuram 
 Halcyon Castle - The Summer palace of The Travancore Royal family, constructed by Sethu Lakshmi Bayi, now converted to The Kovalam Palace under The Leela Kovalam - A Raviz Hotel,  Kovalam, Thiruvananthapuram 
Kuthira Malika - Built by Swathi Thirunal Rama Varma of Travancore, Thiruvananthapuram 
 Kilimanoor Palace - Birthplace of Raja Ravi Varma, Thiruvananthapuram
 Koyikkal Palace, Nedumangadu, Thiruvananthapuram 
 Krishnapuram Palace, Kayamkulam 
 Sri Moolam Thirunal Palace, Kollam - Rest house of Travancore Kings
 Thevally Palace, Kollam - Outhouse of erstwhile Travancore Kings
 Cheena Kottaram, Chinnakkada - A unique blend of Indian, European, Islamic and Moorish architecture
 Hill Palace, Tripunithura, Cochin 
 Mattancherry Palace (Dutch Palace), Cochin 
 Bolgatty Palace, Bolgatty Island, Cochin
 Shakthan Thampuran Palace, Thrissur - former residence of the Cochin royal family, now a museum
 British Residency, Kollam - Architectural Marvel built by Col. John Munro
 Nedumpuram Palace
 Lakshmipuram Palace - is the royal palace of the Parappanad royal families at Changanassery

Uttarakhand

 Ananda in the Himalayas (Narendranagar Palace) - former residence of Garhwal royals, now a destination resort and spa, Narendranagar

West Bengal
 Bhutan House - royal residence of the Dorji family, Kalimpong
 Cooch Behar Palace - former royal residence, Cooch Behar
 Andul Rajbari - royal residence of the Andul Dutta Chaudhury Family Kayastha family, Andul Howrah
 Hazarduari Palace - former royal residence, Murshidabad
 Jhargram Palace -  former royal residence and heritage hotel, Jhargram
 Marble Palace - former residence of Raja Rajendra Mullick, Kolkata
 Wasif Manzil - former royal residence, Murshidabad

Other states
 Aali Palace - royal family of Aali, Odisha
Padmanabhapuram Palace - Seat of the Maharaja of Travancore
 New Palace - Seat of Maharaja of Kolhapur
 Fatehpur Sikri - former royal residence of Emperor Akbar
 Grand Palace, Srinagar - former royal residence, today hotel, Srinagar
 Khasbagh Palace - Palace of the Maharaja of Rampur
 Anand Bagh Palace - Seat of the Maharaja of Darbhanga, 
 Rashtrapati Bhavan - Seat of the President, former viceregal residence, Delhi
 Shaniwar Wada, Pune - royal residence of Peshwas
 Ujjayanta Palace - former royal palace of Tripura
 Athangudi Palace - Chettinad Palace House in Athangudi, Karaikudi, Tamil Nadu
 Gajlaxmi Palace - Palace of Singhdeo dynasty, Dhenkanal princely state in Dhenkanal, Odisha
 Bara Imambara - leisure court of Awadh Nawab, Lucknow 
 Ramnagar Fort - Palace of Kashinaresh, Bhumihar king of Benaras state .
The Belgadia Palace - Palace of Bhanjja Dynasty, Mayurbhanj princely state, Mayurbhanj, Odisha
Royal Thibaw Palace(where last king of Myanmar was exiled), Ratnagiri, Maharashtra

 Vijay Vilas Palace, jawhar fort , Jawhar Maharashtra

See also 

Palaces
Palaces
India